Enock Chama is a Zambian boxer. He competed in the men's middleweight event at the 1980 Summer Olympics. At the 1980 Summer Olympics, he lost to José Gómez Mustelier of Cuba.

References

Year of birth missing (living people)
Living people
Zambian male boxers
Olympic boxers of Zambia
Boxers at the 1980 Summer Olympics
Boxers at the 1978 Commonwealth Games
Commonwealth Games bronze medallists for Zambia
Commonwealth Games medallists in boxing
Place of birth missing (living people)
Middleweight boxers
Medallists at the 1978 Commonwealth Games